The 2007 Uttarakhand Legislative Assembly election were the 2nd Vidhan Sabha (Legislative Assembly) election of the state of Uttarakhand in India. The elections were held on 21 February 2007, when the Bharatiya Janata Party emerged as the largest party with 35 seats in the 70-seat legislature. One seat short of forming a majority, the BJP have had to rely on support from the Uttarakhand Kranti Dal and three Independents to form the government. The Indian National Congress became the official opposition, holding 21 seats.

Results

The Bharatiya Janata Party emerged as the largest party with 35 seats in a house of 70. They were still one short of the majority to form a government. After much wrangling it was announced that the Uttarakhand Kranti Dal and the three Independents would be supporting the government. The incumbent Indian National Congress Government lost as they had only 21 seats out of 70 seats.

After protracted discussions it was announced the B. C. Khanduri would be Chief Minister and B. S. Koshyari was to manage party work.

List of elected Assembly members

See also
 2nd Uttarakhand Assembly
 First Khanduri ministry
 Pokhriyal ministry
 Second Khanduri ministry
 Elections in Uttarakhand
 Politics of Uttarakhand
 2007 elections in India

References

External links
 Elected Members of Legislative Assembly of Uttarakhand, Official list Govt. of Uttarakhand.

2007
Uttarakhand